Bárbara Rezende Clark (born May 22, 1991) is a Brazilian model and actress, best known for being the winner of the sixth season of the Brazilian version of The Farm.

Career
Born in Rio de Janeiro, Bárbara is the daughter of Brazilian model, actress and television presenter Monique Evans with the American businessman José Clark. She was a test tube baby.

In 2011 appeared as the cover of Playboy Magazine with great success.

In 2013 she joined A Fazenda 6 and won the award two million.

In 2015 she recorded the miniseries "Dois Irmãos" to Rede Globo that is scheduled to debut in 2017. The attraction is based on the book of the same, written by Milton Hatoum and published in 2000. Her character is Lívia.

A Fazenda
On Jun 21, 2013, two days before the premiere of six season of A Fazenda, which aired on Rede Record, Evans was the first name confirmed after a prize draw to reveal the identity of one of the sixteen participants.

On September 29, 2013, after 100 days of confinement, she was crowned the winner of the season, beating the lawyer Denise Rocha and actor Marcos Oliver the final vote, taking home the R$2 million prize.

 Trivia
 Evans is the youngest female winner of the Brazilian version of the reality show so far.
 She is one of three winners who were not farmer of the week during the confinement, the others are Karina Bacchi winner the second season and Viviane Araújo winner of the fifth season.

References

External links
Bárbara Evans on Ego
Bárbara Evans Profile on R7.com

1991 births
Living people
Actresses from Rio de Janeiro (city)
Brazilian people of American descent
Brazilian female models
Brazilian actresses
Brazilian evangelicals
Reality show winners
The Farm (TV series) winners